The Tamil Nadu Rice Research Institute (TRRI) is an Indian research institute working in the field of rice under Tamil Nadu Agricultural University (TNAU).  Situated in Aduthurai, in Thanjavur district, it was established in April, 1985 in TNAU to meet the research requirements of the region with the help of existing Agricultural Colleges and Research centres and perform lead function for rice and rice based cropping system research. TRRI coordinate the research programmes of all the stations of the state on rice and rice based cropping system research. This directorate responsible for coordinating research in the Region II of the TNAU.

History
It is first established as a Research Station at Manganallur in 1912, subsequently shifted to Aduthurai as Agricultural Research Station in 1922. In 1962 it was renamed as Regional Research Station, and about a decade later in 1973, University Research Centre of Tamil Nadu Agricultural University (TNAU) started in State Regional Research Station and University. Finally in 1981, the two Research Centres were merged and named Tamil Nadu Rice Research Institute, it was elevated as a Directorate (Rice Lead Centre) of the University in 1985.

Units
The following units operate at TRRI:
Crop Improvement
Crop management
Plant Protection

References

External links
 Tamil Nadu Rice Research Institute, Official website

Rice research institutes
Organisations based in Tamil Nadu
Research institutes in Tamil Nadu
Thanjavur district
Research institutes established in 1985
Agricultural research institutes in India
Agriculture in Tamil Nadu
Rice production in India
1985 establishments in Tamil Nadu